The 1983 season of the Paraguayan Primera División, the top category of Paraguayan football, was played by 10 teams. The national champions were Olimpia.

Results

Third stage

Group A

Group B

Final stage

Championship playoff

External links
Paraguay 1983 season at RSSSF

Para
Paraguayan Primera División seasons
1